The 1964–65 Divizia B was the 25th season of the second tier of the Romanian football league system.

The format has been maintained to two series, each of them having 14 teams. At the end of the season the winners of the series promoted to Divizia A and the last two places from each series relegated to Divizia C.

Team changes

To Divizia B
Promoted from Divizia C
 CFR Roșiori
 Laminorul Brăila
 Recolta Carei
 Vagonul Arad

Relegated from Divizia A
 Știința Timișoara
 Siderurgistul Galați

From Divizia B
Relegated to Divizia C
 Ceahlăul Piatra Neamț
 Arieșul Turda
 Foresta Fălticeni
 Flamura Roșie Oradea

Promoted to Divizia A
 Știința Craiova
 Minerul Baia Mare

Renamed teams 
ASMD Satu Mare was renamed as Sătmăreana Satu Mare.

CSM Cluj was renamed as Clujeana Cluj.

Laminorul Brăila was renamed as Constructorul Brăila.

Other teams 
Constructorul Brăila (at that time Progresul Brăila) was relegated to the Local Championship (equivalent of Liga IV or Divizia D)  at the end of the 1962–63 Divizia B season due to match fixing. After relegation, a new entity, Laminorul Brăila was enrolled in the re-established Divizia C, the new entity also merging with the old one thus becoming its successor. In this way it was possible that after a single season of absence the team would re-appear in the Divizia B, this time under the name of Constructorul Brăila.

Mureșul Târgu Mureș and ASA Târgu Mureș merged, the first one being absorbed by the second one. The new entity was named as ASA Mureșul Târgu Mureș.

League tables

Serie I

Serie II

See also 

 1964–65 Divizia A
 1964–65 Divizia C

References

Liga II seasons
Romania
2